is a Japanese violinist and conductor.

Biography 
Born in Japan but raised in Vienna, Joji Hattori studied violin at the Vienna Academy of Music and sociology at Oxford University, and furthered his violin studies with violinists Yehudi Menuhin and Vladimir Spivakov. Joji Hattori's international soloist career started after winning the Yehudi Menuhin International Competition for Young Violinists in 1989. In 1999 Hattori decided to start a conducting career and in 2002 won a prize at the Maazel-Vilar Conductor's Competition which led to conducting engagements in New York.

Since has been Principal Resident Conductor of the Erfurt Theater, music director of the Tokyo Ensemble and since 2004 he has been Associate Conductor of the Das Wiener KammerOrchester. He has been invited to conduct many major orchestras including the Philharmonia Orchestra, Vienna Symphony Orchestra and the orchestra of the Vienna State Opera.

Hattori is a Visiting Professor of violin at the Royal Academy of Music in London.

References

External links 
 

1969 births
20th-century classical violinists
20th-century conductors (music)
21st-century classical violinists
21st-century conductors (music)
Academics of the Royal Academy of Music
Japanese classical violinists
Japanese conductors (music)
Japanese male conductors (music)
Honorary Members of the Royal Academy of Music
Living people
Male classical violinists